Twin Hearts is a Philippine television drama romance series broadcast by GMA Network. Directed by Dominic Zapata and Erick Salud, it stars Dingdong Dantes, Tanya Garcia, Dennis Trillo and Karylle. It premiered on October 20, 2003 on the network's Telebabad line up replacing Habang Kapiling Ka. The series concluded on June 18, 2004 with a total of 173 episodes. It was replaced by Marinara in its timeslot.

Cast and characters

Lead cast
 Dingdong Dantes as Adrian Asuncion
 Tanya Garcia as Althea Fontanilla
 Dennis Trillo as Glenn Saraga
 Karylle as Iris Medira / Jade Villanueva

Supporting cast
 Rudy Fernandez as Oscar Saraga
 Pops Fernandez as Adelle Medira
 Lani Mercado as Vanessa Fontanilla
 Jestoni Alarcon as Renan Fontanilla
 Liza Lorena as Sofia Fontanilla
 Toby Alejar as Gaston Asuncion
 Alicia Alonzo as Ceta Saraga
 Sandy Andolong as Frida Villanueva
 Albert Martinez as Ben Katigbac
 Pinky Amador as Murielle Brillo
 Tin Arnaldo as Yvette Kesller
 Maybelyn dela Cruz as Faith Ang
 Gabby Eigenmann as Cedrick Sebastian
 Marky Lopez as Joey Santos
 Melisa Henderson as Coco Borha

Guest cast
 Michael de Mesa
 Bembol Roco
 Marianne dela Riva
 Yayo Aguila
 Roy Alvarez
 Alvin Aragon
 Val Iglesias
 Rez Cortez
 Dyan Delfin
 Angel Locsin
 Vivian Foz
 January Isaac
 Vangie Labalan
 Berting Labra
 Maureen Larrazabal
 Joey Padilla
 Robert Ortega
 Jordan Herrera
 Jay Salas
 Frank Garcia
 Geoff Rodriguez
 Richard Quan
 Jake Roxas
 Jean Saburit
 Railey Valeroso
 Rich Vergara

References

External links
 

2003 Philippine television series debuts
2004 Philippine television series endings
Filipino-language television shows
GMA Network drama series
Philippine romance television series
Television shows set in the Philippines